Peak Dale is a small village in Derbyshire, England,  northeast of Buxton and  southeast of Dove Holes. The population falls within the civil parish of Wormhill.

The village is between Dove Holes Quarry (to the north) and Tunstead Quarry (to the south), with other smaller quarries in the vicinity. It was built to house quarry workers and their families, but some of the original houses have now been demolished. The village has a club (Great Rocks Club), a playground and a primary school.

Great Rocks Dale lies immediately south of the village.

Railway
The village previously had a railway station called Peak Forest railway station, on the Midland Railway line, which closed when passenger services were withdrawn. However, the station building survives as offices for the adjacent quarry as does the line through the station, which is now known as the Green Rocks Line.

References

External links

Villages in Derbyshire
High Peak, Derbyshire